Douglas Dakin (1907–1995) was a British historian, academic and professor emeritus of the Birkbeck College of the University of London (1935–1974). He is especially known for his work in the Neohellenic Studies field, in which he devoted the greatest part of his study and research, especially focusing on the Greek Revolution through the mid-20th century period.

Biography

Early life and studies
Dakin was born in Gloucestershire, England. His father was headmaster at the school of that town; when, in 1920, the Rendcomb College was founded near Cirencester, his father sent him there to study. In 1926 Dakin went up to Peterhouse, Cambridge with a scholarship, where he studied history. He then, started teaching for the first time in 1931, at the Haberdashers' Aske's School, London. Dakin then began his PhD, on Anne-Robert-Jacques Turgot at the Birkbeck College of the University of London.

Academic career and World War II 
In 1935, Dakin was appointed lecturer in the Birkbeck College. Though his Turgot and the Ancien Régime work was published in 1939, a distinguished achievement for a scholar of his age, his main academic interests shifted from France to modern Greece; the cause of this was Dakin's military service during World War II in Greece.  Dakin had joined the Royal Air Force Volunteer Reserve (RAFVR) and served in Egypt and Greece as the liaison officer to the Royal Hellenic Air force and also had been involved with the Greek People's Liberation Army (ELAS). In 1945 he returned to the UK from the Middle East and was posted in the Allied/Foreign Liaison Section of the British Air Ministry.

Neohellenic studies 
After the end of the war, Dakin returned to the Birkbeck College where additional duties as an archivist were assigned to him. He faced bureaucracy with humour and parallel to his popular night classes on the post-Napoleonic Congress system and his supervisory duties of postgraduate students, acquiring for both the fame of an enlightened and respected teacher. His main work centered on modern Greek history for which Paul, king of Greece, awarded him the Golden Cross of the Order of the Phoenix; Darkin was also named an honorary doctor of the Aristotle University of Thessaloniki in 1969 and a corresponding member of the Athens Academy from 1971. Following the foundation of the University of Cyprus, Darkin donated to it a big part of its book collection, consisting of about 850 titles; he then became and remained involved with the Cypriot Centre for Scientific Studies.

Selected works
 Turgot and the ancien régime in France (1939)
 Documents on British foreign policy. First series. (1955)
 British and American philhellenes during the War of Greek Independence, 1821–1833 (1955)
 A Short History of Modern Greece, 1821 – 1957 (1957 With E.S. Forster)
 British intelligence of events in Greece, 1824–1827 (1957)
 The Greek Struggle in Macedonia 1897–1913. (1966, 1993)
 The Unification Of Greece, 1770 – 1923 (1972)
 Documents on British Foreign Policy, 1919–1939 (1973 with W.N. Medlicott and Gillian Bennett)
 The Greek Struggle for Independence, 1821 – 1833 (1973)
 The Congress of Vienna, 1814–1815 and its Antecedents in Alan Sked, ed., Europe's Balance of Power 1815–1848 (1979 London: Macmillan)

Dakin Prize 

Dakin's family has established an annual prize for Birkbeck College students who excel in history, in memory of him; as the college's webpage reads:

References 

1907 births
1995 deaths
People from Gloucestershire
Academics of Birkbeck, University of London
Alumni of Peterhouse, Cambridge
Alumni of Birkbeck, University of London
Royal Air Force Volunteer Reserve personnel of World War II
20th-century British historians
Royal Air Force officers
Corresponding Members of the Academy of Athens (modern)
Gold Crosses of the Order of the Phoenix (Greece)